Inape xerophanes is a species of moth of the family Tortricidae and is endemic to Peru.

References

Moths described in 1909
Endemic fauna of Peru
Moths of South America
xerophanes